Bathylasmatidae is a family of barnacles belonging to the order Balanomorpha.

Genera:
 Aaptolasma Newman & Ross, 1971
 Bathylasma Newman & Ross, 1971
 Hexelasma Hoek, 1913
 Mesolasma Foster, 1981
 Tessarelasma Withers, 1936
 Tetrachaelasma Newman & Ross, 1971

References

Sessilia
Crustacean families